Indian Creek is a stream in Allen County, Kansas, and Anderson County, Kansas, in the United States. It is a tributary of the Neosho River.

Indian Creek was so named due to an early settler finding a fresh Native American grave on its banks.

See also
List of rivers of Kansas

References

Rivers of Allen County, Kansas
Rivers of Anderson County, Kansas
Rivers of Kansas